The twenty-second government of Israel was formed by Yitzhak Shamir of Likud on 20 October 1986. Shamir replaced Shimon Peres of the Alignment as Prime Minister as part of a rotation deal within the national unity coalition between the two parties. The only other change to the coalition was that the one-seat Morasha faction was not included, with the National Religious Party, Agudat Yisrael, Shas, Shinui and Ometz remaining part of the government, although Shinui left on 26 May 1987.

The government held office until 22 December 1988, when the twenty-third government was formed, following the November 1988 elections.

Cabinet members

References

External links
Ninth Knesset: Government 22 Knesset website

 22
1986 establishments in Israel
1988 disestablishments in Israel
Cabinets established in 1986
Cabinets disestablished in 1988
1986 in Israeli politics
1987 in Israeli politics
1988 in Israeli politics
 22
Grand coalition governments
Rotation governments